The  was a Japanese oval gold coin in Edo period feudal Japan, equal to one ryō, another early Japanese monetary unit. It was a central part of Tokugawa coinage.

The Keichō era koban, a gold piece, contained about one ryō of gold, so that koban carried a face value of one ryō. However, successive mintings of the koban had varying (usually diminishing) amounts of gold. As a result, the ryō as a unit of weight of gold and the ryō as the face value of the koban were no longer synonymous.

In modern times, they are sold as Engimono (at-least, gold-foil cardboard versions), from Shinto shrines.

Foreign trade
The Japanese economy before the mid-19th century was based largely on rice. The standard unit of measure was the koku, the amount of rice needed to feed one person for one year. Farmers made their tax payments of rice which eventually made its way into the coffers of the central government; and similarly, vassals were annually paid a specified koku of rice. The Portuguese who came to Japan in the 1550s, however, preferred gold to rice; and the koban, which was equal to three koku of rice, became the coin of choice in foreign trade.

Some feudal lords began minting their own koban, but the value was debased with alloys of varying gold content.  Edo authorities issued one currency reform after another and just about all of them debased the koban further. Additionally, counterfeit koban circulated after each reform, their value slightly less than that of the then current koban. By the time of Commodore Matthew C. Perry's visit in 1853, counterfeit koban from previous eras were preferred by merchants to the newer variants. The fraudulent older pieces were more valuable than newly minted koban.

With the Meiji Restoration in 1868 a new series of coins was ordered based on European currency systems and the koban was discontinued.

Cultural references

In the Konami franchise Ganbare Goemon, the lead character Goemon throws koban as shurikens.

The Japanese idiom  has a similar meaning to the English phrase casting pearls before swine.

The Maneki Neko is often depicted holding a koban, though the koban most Maneki Neko hold have the denomination ten million ryō written on them.

In Super Mario Odyssey, the regional coins in the feudal Japan themed Bowser's Kingdom are kobans with Bowser's face on them.

See also

 Ōban
 Ryō
 Omamori
 Ofuda
 Fulu
 Spirit tablet
 Thai Buddha amulet

References

Gold coins
Coins of Japan
Economy of feudal Japan
Modern obsolete currencies